Piera Fatehial is a village and union council of Chakwal District in the Punjab Province of Pakistan. It is  a village of Talagang Tehsil, the word "Pira" is from Pothari meaning sitting or chair, while "Fatehial" is a clan of the Awan Tribe.

The village is located around 15 km from Talagang, its population is more than 10,000, it is one of the most educated village in the area. It has a fresh water canal which is in some places especially near the village 300 ft down from the ground level which make it same like a valley that is in some places 1 km in width. It is the picnic place in the area and is surrounded by green small hills.  It has 2 small dams. It is known for its ground nuts.

References

Union councils of Chakwal District
Populated places in Chakwal District